Eric Robinson (13 December 1908 – 24 July 1974) was a conductor and presenter of music for the BBC.

During World War II, Robinson served in the Royal Army Ordnance Corps: in 1943, he was with the depot band at Chilwell Central Ordnance Depot, and conducted "The Blue Rockets", a section of the band who provided light music. He was twice the musical director of the Eurovision Song Contest when staged in London in 1960 and 1963 and on other occasions between 1957 and 1965, Robinson conducted the orchestra accompanying the United Kingdom's entry in the competition.

In 1962, he provided the financial support and backing for the Mellotron tape-replay keyboard, and was heavily involved in the original marketing and promotion. He hoped the popularity of a new and novel instrument would revitalise his career.

Robinson's elder brother Stanford Robinson (1904–84) was a popular conductor and composer.

His daughter Vivienne Robinson married the magician David Nixon in 1961.
He died 24 July 1974 aged 65.

References

External links 
 

1908 births
1974 deaths
BBC people
British male conductors (music)
Eurovision Song Contest conductors
20th-century British conductors (music)
20th-century British male musicians
British Army personnel of World War II
Royal Army Ordnance Corps soldiers